The BET Award for Best Male R&B/Pop Artist is awarded to the overall best male contemporary R&B, soul, and pop singers who have released an album the previous or same year. The all-time winner in this category is Chris Brown with six wins, he is also the most nominated artist with fifteen nominations.

Winners and nominees 
Winners are listed first and highlighted in bold.

2000s

2010s

2020s

Multiple wins and nominations

Wins 

 6 wins
 Chris Brown

 3 wins
 Bruno Mars
 Usher

 2 wins
 Ne-Yo

Nominations 

 15 nominations
 Chris Brown

 10 nominations
 Usher

 7 nominations
 The Weeknd

 6 nominations
 Trey Songz
 Bruno Mars

 4 nominations
 John Legend
 Ne-Yo

 3 nominations
 Anthony Hamilton
 R. Kelly
 Khalid
 Maxwell
 Musiq
 Anderson .Paak
 Justin Timberlake

 2 nominations
 August Alsina
 Raheem DeVaughn
 Jamie Foxx
 Giveon
 Jaheim
 Miguel
 Prince

See also 
 BET Award for Best Female R&B/Pop Artist

References 

BET Awards